General elections were held in Liechtenstein on 5 April 1926. The result was a victory for the ruling Christian-Social People's Party, which won 9 of the 15 seats in the Landtag.

Results

By electoral district

References

Liechtenstein
General
1926 04
Liechtenstein
1926